Taylor Farm is a historic farm and national historic district located in Richlands, Onslow County, North Carolina. The main house was designed by Leslie N. Boney and built in 1931–1932.  It is a two-story, brick dwelling with Colonial Revival and Bungalow / American Craftsman style design elements. Other contributing resources include two garages (c. 1931-1932), pump house (c. 1931-1932), barn (c. 1931-1932), Woodward-Taylor Cemetery (c. 1900), silo complex (c. 1940), and the surrounding agricultural landscape.

It was listed on the National Register of Historic Places in 1999.

References

Farms on the National Register of Historic Places in North Carolina
Historic districts on the National Register of Historic Places in North Carolina
American Craftsman architecture in North Carolina
Bungalow architecture in North Carolina
Colonial Revival architecture in North Carolina
Houses completed in 1932
Buildings and structures in Onslow County, North Carolina
National Register of Historic Places in Onslow County, North Carolina